Papa's Got a Brand New Baghdad is a 2004 album by the Capitol Steps.

Track listing
Green Green Grass at Home
Help Rwanda
Ain't No Surplus, Now It's Gone
Democratic Hit Parade
I Wish I Was on Oxycontin
Hillary's Way
Cameroon
Papa's Got a Brand New Baghdad
Spider Hole
I Want a Guy Just Like the Guy Who Married Dear Old Dad
Kobe Bryant Jewelers
Frogs at War
Goodbye, Uday, Qusay
Cows Gone Mad
SuperCaliforniaRecallFreakShowWasAtrocious
The Fondler
Lirty Dies

References

Capitol Steps albums
2004 live albums
2000s comedy albums
Self-released albums
Songs about George W. Bush